David Bulfield (born ) was an English cricketer. He was a right-handed batsman and a leg-break bowler who played for Dorset. He was born in Lancaster.

Having represented the team in the Minor Counties Championship since 1956, at the age of 18, Bulfield made a single List A appearance, during the 1973 season. From the opening order, he scored 5 runs, as Dorset lost the match by 79 runs.

External links
David Bulfield at Cricket Archive 

1938 births
Living people
Cricketers from Lancaster, Lancashire
Dorset cricketers
English cricketers